Mpoto Mpoto is a  Ghanaian cuisine made from cocoyam or yam. It is also known as Yam Pottage and Asaro (Yoruba language) by Nigerians. It is made from several ingredients including fish and onion.

Recipe

Ingredients 

 Medium-sized cocoyam or yam
 1 medium-sized onion
 2 medium-sized tomatoes
 Dried Herrings or fish
 Pepper
 Palm oil
 Salt to taste
 Water

Method 

 Peel and wash the cocoyam or yam, then cut into small chunks
 Place yam in a pot together with onion and tomatoes and pepper.
 Add water enough to cover the content and boil between 25 and 35 minutes.
 Wash and add dried herrings or fish to the pot.
 Cook until tender and remove tomatoes, pepper and onions and grind.
 Add the ground mixture to the yam on fire.
 Add Palm oil and salt to taste.
 Reduce heat and stir the mixture and allow it to cook intermittently

References

External links
 Ghanaian Hotpot/Mpoto-Mpoto
 How To prepare mpoto mpoto

African cuisine
Ghanaian cuisine
National dishes